Mary Catherine Bolton, stage name Polly Bolton, later known by her married name of Lady Thurlow (1790/91–1830), was an English actress, remembered particularly for playing Ophelia.

Life
Bolton was the daughter of James Richard Bolton, an attorney. She made her first appearance on the stage on 8 October 1801, in The Beggar's Opera as "Miss Bolton" 

In 1811, she played the part of Ophelia in Hamlet opposite John Kemble, giving a performance described as "in a decorous style, relying on the familiar images of the white dress, loose hair, and wild flowers, to convey a polite feminine distraction".

On 13 November 1813, at St Martin-in-the-Fields, she married Edward Hovell-Thurlow, 2nd Baron Thurlow (1781–1829), and her stage career ended. They had three sons, including Edward Thomas Hovell-Thurlow, the 3rd Baron. At the time, it would not have been socially possible for a woman who had married into the ruling class to continue a career as an actress.

Her descendant Roualeyn Hovell-Thurlow-Cumming-Bruce, 9th Baron Thurlow, inherited the title in 2013 and in 2015 was elected by his fellow peers to a vacant seat in the House of Lords.

See also
List of entertainers who married titled Britishers

Notes

External links
Mary Catherine Bolton, Lady Thurlow, at nationalgalleries.org

1790s births
1830 deaths
English stage actresses
Thurlow